The 1993 World Women's Handball Championship was the 11th World Championship in women's handball took place in Norway from 24 November to 5 December 1993 and was played between 16 nations. In the final it would be Germany would take home their first title as a unified nation as they defeated Denmark in extra-time.

Qualification
Host nation
 

Qualified from the 1990 World Championship
 
 
 
 
 
 

Qualified from the 1992 World Championship B
 
 
 
 
 

Qualified from the 1991 Pan American Women's Handball Championship
 

Qualified from the 1992 African Women's Handball Championship
 

Qualified from the 1993 Asian Women's Handball Championship

Squads

Preliminary round

Group A

Group B

Group C

Group D

Main Round

Group 1

Group 2

Classification round
Losers of preliminary round plays for places 13–16.

Finals

11th place match

9th place match

7th place match

5th place match

Bronze final

Final

Final standings

*Even though Czechoslovakia had split into the Czech republic and Slovakia, the countries still competed with a unified team.

Top scorers

References

 International Handball Federation
 WC93 at todor66

World Handball Championship tournaments
World Women's Handball Championship, 1993
World Women's Handball Championship, 1993
Handball
Women's handball in Norway
November 1993 sports events in Europe
December 1993 sports events in Europe